A pastoral lease, sometimes called a pastoral run, is an arrangement used in both Australia and New Zealand where government-owned Crown land is leased out to graziers for the purpose of livestock grazing on rangelands.

Australia
Pastoral leases exist in both Australian commonwealth law and state jurisdictions. They do not give all the rights that attach to freehold land: there are usually conditions which include a time period and the type of activity permitted.  According to Austrade, such leases cover about 44% of mainland Australia, mostly in arid and semi-arid regions and the tropical savannahs. They usually allow people to use the land for grazing traditional livestock, but more recently have been also used for non-traditional livestock (such as kangaroos or camels), tourism and other activities. Management of the leases falls mainly to state and territory governments.

Under Commonwealth of Australia law, applicable only in the Northern Territory, they are agreements that allow for the use of Crown land by farmers, etc.

In the Australian states, leases constitute a land apportionment system created in the mid-19th century to facilitate the orderly division and sale of land to European colonists. Leases within state jurisdictions have variations as to applicability from state to state.

Native title can co-exist with pastoral leases, and  Indigenous land use agreements may be made between the leaseholder and the affected native title group.

The Commonwealth Scientific and Industrial Research Organisation has conducted research on pastoral lands in the terms of the lands as rangelands on a country-wide basis.

Relevant legislation and management
Australian jurisdictions have land management legislation that affects the administration of pastoral leases:

 New South Wales - Western Lands Act 1901
 Northern Territory – Pastoral Land Act 1992 and Crown Lands Act 1992
 Queensland – Land Act 1994
 South Australia –  Pastoral Land Management and Conservation Act 1989 and Crown Lands Act 1929
 Western Australia – Land Administration Act 1997

Pastoral lease information
 Northern Territory
 Queensland
 South Australia
 Western Australia - see List of Pastoral leases in Western Australia

New Zealand
The statutory provisions of pastoral leases are covered by the New Zealand Crown Pastoral Land Act 1998 and the Land Act 1948. The holder of the lease has:

 the exclusive right of pasturage
 a perpetual right of renewal of the lease for terms of 33 years
 no right to the soil, and
 no right to acquire the fee simple of any of the land.

Pastoral leases are undergoing a voluntary tenure review process.

See also

 Cattle station
 Sheep station
 List of pastoral leases in Western Australia

References 

Australian property law
Australian English
Livestock in Australia
 Pastoral
Agriculture in New Zealand